Liburnascincus is a genus of skinks. All are endemic to Australia.

Species
The following 4 species, listed alphabetically by specific name, are recognized as being valid:

Liburnascincus artemis Hoskin & Couper, 2015 
Liburnascincus coensis (Mitchell, 1953) – Coen rainbow-skink 
Liburnascincus mundivensis (Broom, 1898) – Outcrop rainbow-skink 
Liburnascincus scirtetis  (Ingram & Covacevich, 1980) – Black Mountain rainbow-skink, Black Mountain skink

Nota bene: A binomial authority in parentheses indicates that the species was originally described in a genus other than Liburnascincus.

References

 
Lizard genera
Taxa named by Richard Walter Wells
Taxa named by Cliff Ross Wellington